Protremaster is an extinct genus of sea stars that lived in the Early Jurassic (age range: 196.5 to 189.6 Ma).  Its fossils have been found in the Lully Foothills Formation of Antarctica.

Sources

External links
 in the Paleobiology Database

Valvatida
Prehistoric starfish genera
Jurassic echinoderms
Extinct animals of Antarctica